Tuckahoe High School is a historic high school located in Eastchester, Westchester County, New York. It was built in 1930–1931, and is a three-story brick building with Aztec-inspired cast stone trim in the Art Deco style.  The front facade is composed of a three-story, nine bay central pavilion, deeply recessed two-story, five bay connecting wings, and projecting, identical, two-story, five bay end pavilions.

It was added to the National Register of Historic Places in 2010.

Notable alumni
Al Carapella, professional football player, San Francisco 49ers
David Osit, Emmy Award-winning documentary filmmaker

See also
National Register of Historic Places listings in southern Westchester County, New York

References

External links
Tuckahoe High School website

Eastchester, New York
School buildings on the National Register of Historic Places in New York (state)
Art Deco architecture in New York (state)
School buildings completed in 1931
Public high schools in Westchester County, New York
National Register of Historic Places in Westchester County, New York
Tuckahoe, Westchester County, New York